Heracles or Herakles is the Greek mythic hero and son of the god Zeus.

Heracles may also refer to:

Hercules, the Roman mythological analogue to the Greek Heracles
Herakles the Dactyl, a separate figure in Greek mythology said to have originated the Olympic Games

Film and television
 Bongo Heracles from X Bomber, also known as Barry Hercules in the UK dubbed version, Star Fleet
 Herakles (film), a 1962 film by Werner Herzog

Sports
 Heracles Almelo, the Dutch football club
 Iraklis, a sports club based in Thessaloniki, Greece

Games
 Glory of Heracles (series), a Japanese role-playing video game series
Glory of Heracles, a 2008 video game from the series
 Heracles Chariot Racing, a video game for PlayStation 2 and WiiWare by Neko Entertainment

Literature
 Heracles Papyrus, an ancient Greek manuscript
 Herakles (Euripides), also known as Heracles the Mad, a Greek tragedy by Euripides
 Herakles, a play by Frank Wedekind

Other uses
 Heracles (bird), extinct parrots
 Herakles (pusher), a Finnish boat
 Herakles (radar)
 HERACLES (spacecraft), a planned Moon lander
 Heracles of Macedon, a reputed son of Alexander the Great
 5143 Heracles, an asteroid
 G-AAXC Heracles,  named Handley Page H.P.42 airliner

See also
Hercules (disambiguation)
Hercule (disambiguation)
Ercole (disambiguation)
Heraklion (disambiguation)
Iraklis (disambiguation)